Mowsley, pronounced "mowzley" (rhyming with "cows") (from Muslai - mouse infested field) is a small village in the south part of Leicestershire.  The modern village has just under 100 dwellings. The population (including Knaptoft) at the 2011 census was 302.

Entries in Domesday
According to the Domesday Book, Mowsley had two manors in 1086, situated in the ancient hundred of Gartree. This was a chapelry in the ancient ecclesiastical parish of Knaptoft with the chapel being built c1250AD. The chapel, which was sensitively restored at the end of the 19th century has a perfect cruciform plan and contains three piscinas, a large carved altar stone and a font which has the original bowl.

Schools

The Church of England School in Mowsley was built in 1864, but there had been a Sunday school in the village from 1833, which was attended by 17 boys and 22 girls. By 1871 there were 18 boys and 18 girls who attended the new school and in 1872 a school committee was formed who assumed responsibility for the ongoing management of the school, which had previously been the remit of the rector and the Churchwardens. A school mistress was also appointed in this year at a salary of £22 10s a year. In 1892, the cost of the general management and upkeep of the school was £64. The number of pupils two years later was just 16. In 1900 the school attendance had increased to 22, due to the closure of Laughton school and the subsequent transfer of its students to Mowsley. In 1923 it was decided that children over the age of 11 would attend the 'senior top' at Husbands Bosworth National School, however this was a fairly short lived arrangement, because the 'senior top' closed in 1930, transferring all senior pupils to Church Langton. The school in Mowsley continued as a junior school for the Mowsley and Laughton districts and in 1933 it had 35 pupils in attendance. The junior school eventually came under the jurisdiction of the local authority and by 1958, it had an attendance of 22.

Modern village
Most of the dwellings are of 19th- or 20th-century origin. The oldest property is the thatched Millstone House which may have been one of the manor houses. A restored 17th-century timber-framed house with mud lower panel and wattle and daub upper panel infills exists.

Unusually, the medieval village boundary can be clearly traced. Virtually the whole village sits within this boundary, with the village "footprint" differing little from that of 500 years ago.

The village has a pub but no shops and the village school closed in 2010.

Families of note
The Brabazon family were lords of the manor in the 13th/14th centuries - eventually to become the Earls of Meath. Earthworks in the vicinity of the village represent fishponds and the remains of the Brabazon manor house.

The Barnabas Horton Family emigrated from Mowsley to the US and became one of the founding fathers of Southold, LI c. 1640.  Caleb Horton (b. 1640 d.1702) was the first non-Native American child born on Long Island, in Southold.

References

External links

Villages in Leicestershire
Civil parishes in Harborough District